Francis Meli JCL was born on July 21, 1962 in Poi Island, West New Britain, Papua New Guinea to his parents Anthon Wale and Anna Aisiga. His early education started in 1972 on Poi Island at St. Leo Primary School Sasavoru. In 1978, Francis Meli attended Kimbe Provincial High School and in 1981 he went on to the St. Peter Channel College, East New Britain. From 1985 to 1990 he attended the Holy Spirit Seminary at Bomana. Education has brought Francis Meli to various parts of the world including Saint Paul University in Canada. On November 24, 1991, Francis Meli entered priesthood and has served mostly in East New Britain Province.

Bishop 
Pope Francis has accepted the resignation of bishop Cesare Bonivento of the Diocese of Vanimo for having reached the age limit. As the new diocesan bishop was appointed Father Francis Meli.

References

1962 births
Living people
21st-century Roman Catholic bishops in Papua New Guinea
People from West New Britain Province
Roman Catholic bishops of Vanimo
Papua New Guinean Roman Catholic bishops